Daphnella lymneiformis, common name the volute turret, is a species of very small sea snail, a marine gastropod mollusk in the family Raphitomidae.

Description
The length of the shell varies between 8 mm and 20 mm.

The whorls show narrow, close, revolving ridges, the earlier ones with longitudinal ribs. The color of the shell is white, irregularly maculated with chestnut, often forming longitudinal zigzag markings.

Distribution
D. lymneiformis can be found in Atlantic and Caribbean waters, ranging from the eastern coast of Florida to Brazil. Fossils have been found in Quaternary strata at Kikai Island, Japan; age range: 0.126 to 0.012 Ma

References

 W. P. Woodring. 1928. Miocene Molluscs from Bowden, Jamaica. Part 2: Gastropods and discussion of results. Contributions to the Geology and Palaeontology of the West Indies
 Kilburn, R.N. (1977) Taxonomic studies on the marine Mollusca of southern Africa and Mozambique. Part 1. Annals of the Natal Museum, 23, 173–214

External links
 Adams, C. B. 1850. Description of supposed new species of marine shells which inhabit Jamaica. Contributions to Conchology, 4: 56-68, 109-123
 Rosenberg, G.; Moretzsohn, F.; García, E. F. (2009). Gastropoda (Mollusca) of the Gulf of Mexico, Pp. 579–699 in: Felder, D.L. and D.K. Camp (eds.), Gulf of Mexico–Origins, Waters, and Biota. Texas A&M Press, College Station, Texas.
 
 Gastropods.com: Daphnella lymneiformis

lymneiformis
Gastropods described in 1840